Henry Murray (2 April 1844 – 16 January 1927) was an Australian politician. He was born at Evandale, Tasmania. In 1891 he was elected to the Tasmanian House of Assembly as the Free Trade member for East Devon. His seat was abolished in 1897 and he transferred to Latrobe, moving to Devonport in 1898. He was defeated in 1900 but returned to the Assembly via a by-election for Latrobe in 1902. Although he briefly left his party he was a Liberal when he retired in 1909.

References

1844 births
1927 deaths
Free Trade Party politicians
Commonwealth Liberal Party politicians
Members of the Tasmanian House of Assembly